Elbow Creek is a stream in Taney County, Missouri. The stream headwaters are on the southwest flank of Lime Kiln Mountain within the Mark Twain National Forest. The stream course makes a sharp turn from northeast to southeast about a mile from its source then flows in a meandering fashion south to its confluence with Bull Shoals Lake north of Diamond City which lies across the lake in northern Boone County, Arkansas.

The source is located at:  and the confluence is at:   .

Elbow Creek was so named on account of its irregular course.

References

Rivers of Taney County, Missouri
Rivers of Missouri